Zhonglu is a town in the Enshi Tujia and Miao Autonomous Prefecture, in extreme southwestern Hubei province, China,  southwest of downtown Lichuan, which administers the town, and  west-southwest of Enshi City, the prefectural seat. , it has one residential community and 60 villages under its administration.

Administrative Divisions 
One residential community:
Longqu

Sixty villages:
Honghua, Fanshen, Chatai, Hexin, Qilong, Shuangmiao, Guihua, Zonghe, Tianwan, Hongsha, Zhuba, Zhongling, Nongke, Xiaping, Xiaohe, Gongqiao, Yangjiapo, Xiangyang, Paomu, Xiaoping, Huilong, Dongfeng, Xiaba, Fengle, Shipan, Basheng, Longtang, Zhaipo, Muba, Jinyan, Xilin, Ganxi, Xinjian, Huangla, Fenghuang, Xinglong, Chengchi, Pianqian, Taiping, Jiangyuan, Shaping, Hujiatang, Heilin, Lizhi, Mitanxi, Laowuji, Heli, Hongling, Pingxing, Jinxiu, Liangfeng, Shuanghe, Qingping, Chenggan, Yongxing, Lishan, Minzhu, Chayuan, Shuangzhai, Jinyin

See also 
 List of township-level divisions of Hubei

References 

Township-level divisions of Hubei